Justice Sam Hou Fai is the President of the Court of Final Appeal of Macau, the highest court in Macau, China.

Before his legal career Sam worked in numerous departments in Macau:

 Deputy Secretary of Macau Monetary Authority 1987-1992
 Special Assistant to the Vice-President of the Legislative Council of Macau 1992-1993
 Commissioner of Labour Affairs Bureau 1995-1997
 Judge, Court and Public Prosecutions Office 1995-1997
 Secretary for Economic Coordination (Macau) 1995-1997
 Secretary of Finance Services Bureau (Secretariat for Economy and Finance (Macau)) 2000-2002

Justice Sam is also President of the Conselho dos Magistrados Judiciais and member of the Commissão Independente para a Indigitação de Juízes.

Early life

Sam was born in May 1962 in China and raised in Zhongshan. After entering university in 1978 he entered law school in 1981 and earned his bachelor's degree in law from Peking University in Mainland China. After practicing law in China he moved to Macau in 1986, studied at the University of Coimbra and joined the Public Prosecutions Office of Macau in 1995.

References

1962 births
Presidents of the Court of Final Appeal (Macau)
Living people
Peking University alumni
University of Coimbra alumni